Magharians (al-maghariyyah), Magarite (μαγαρίτης), Moagaritai (μωαγαρίται), Mahgraye (Mahgre) and Magarian are names given by some writers of the late antiquity and the early Middle Ages to people who joined a Jewish-Christian sect sometimes identified as Mohammedans. The name means “people of the caves” from the Arabic term “maghār” meaning “cave”. They believed Jesus Christ was a pre-existent angel described in the Song of Songs 5:10-16. They were also described as Melchisedechians.

See also
 Saracens
 Ishmaelites
 Hagarenes
 Muhajirun

References 

Jewish Christianity
Christian denominations